William Taverner (fl. 1397–1407), of Leominster, was an English politician.

He was a Member (MP) of the Parliament of England for Leominster in September 1397, 1402, 1406 and 1407.

References

14th-century births
15th-century deaths
English MPs September 1397
English MPs 1402
People from Leominster
English MPs 1406
English MPs 1407